Amerigo Vespucci (1454–1512) was an Italian explorer and cartographer.

Amerigo Vespucci may also refer to:

Ships
 CMA CGM Amerigo Vespucci, a container ship built in 2010
 Italian corvette Amerigo Vespucci, a screw corvette of the Italian Navy
 Italian training ship Amerigo Vespucci, a tall ship of the Italian Navy
 SS Amerigo Vespucci, a Liberty ship built during World War II

Other uses
 Américo Vespucio Avenue, an avenue in Santiago, Chile
 Amerigo Vespucci Airport, an airport in Florence, Italy
 Ponte Amerigo Vespucci, a bridge in Florence, Italy